Altena may refer to:

 Altena, town in North Rhine-Westphalia, Germany
 VfB Altena, football club from that town
 Altena Castle, early 12th century castle predating the town
 Berg-Altena, a county originating in the early 12th century and later known as the County of Mark
 Land van Altena, a historical region ( 900 to 1589) and former fiefdom of the Lords of Altena in the Netherlands
 Altena, Drenthe, a village in the municipality of Noordenveld in the Netherlands
 Altena, North Brabant, a municipality in the Netherlands
 Fort Altena, New Netherland, a Dutch colony near Fort Christina, Delaware
 Altena (Noir), the chief antagonist in the anime series Noir
 Altena (automobile), an early Dutch automobile
 Altena (surname), Dutch surname (including Van Altena)

See also 
 Atena (disambiguation)
 Athena (disambiguation)